Kampong Bukit Beruang may refer to:
 Bukit Beruang, a settlement area in Melaka, Malaysia
 Kampong Bukit Beruang, Brunei, a settlement in Brunei